Tebenna chingana is a moth of the family Choreutidae. It is found from Czech Republic, Ukraine and the Khingan Range in Russia.

References

External links
lepiforum.de

Tebenna
Moths described in 1969